"Salt of the Earth" is the final song from English rock band the Rolling Stones album Beggars Banquet (1968).  Written by Mick Jagger and Keith Richards, the song includes an opening lead vocal by Richards. It is the second official track by the group to feature him on lead vocal (the first being "Something Happened to Me Yesterday" from Between the Buttons).

Composition and lyrics
The song was reportedly inspired by John Lennon, with Jagger attempting to write a working class anthem. The lyrics were written primarily by Jagger and salute the working class:

In a twice-repeated stanza, the singer professes a distance from his subject that seemingly belies the sentiment of the verses:

The song uses a quote that refers to a passage in the Bible where Jesus is trying to encourage people to give the best of themselves

"Salt of the Earth" features the acoustic work of Richards, typical of most songs from Beggars Banquet. Richards also performs the slide guitar throughout the song (Brian Jones, who often played slide on previous songs, was absent from these sessions). While some songs from Beggars Banquet were recorded by Jagger and Richards using a personal tape recorder, "Salt of the Earth" was recorded at London's Olympic Sound Studios in May 1968.

Featuring on the song are the Los Angeles Watts Street Gospel Choir and a piano performance by Nicky Hopkins. These additions, and their prominence near the end of the song, are further developed on their next album Let It Bleeds closing song, "You Can't Always Get What You Want".

Critical reception
Jim Beviglia ranked "Salt of the Earth" the 25th best Rolling Stones song in Counting Down the Rolling Stones: Their 100 Finest Songs. Paste called it "a simple ode to the proletariat" and ranked it 37th in its Top 50 Rolling Stones songs. Rolling Stone ranked it 45th in its countdown of the band's top 100 songs, praising Richards' vocals and "gospel reverie."

Other appearances

"Salt of the Earth" has a unique live history. It has only been played once to an instrumental playback and live five times.

The first filmed rendition was for the taping of the 1968 television special The Rolling Stones Rock and Roll Circus (not released until 1996). However, this version features Keith Richards and Mick Jagger singing live while sitting with the audience as the backing track that appeared on Beggars Banquet is played.
It was then revived 21 years later for three performances in Atlantic City during the 1989-1990 Steel Wheels/Urban Jungle Tour, where the Stones were joined onstage by Axl Rose and Izzy Stradlin of Guns N' Roses. Axl and Izzy were given their choice of songs, and when they chose this, the Stones had forgotten it, and had to listen to it to remember.
Jagger and Richards performed it as a duet for the 2001 "The Concert for New York City", commemorating the fallen of September 11, 2001, although they changed the lyrics to make its message more positive (most notably "Let's drink to the good and the evil" was changed to "Let's drink to the good not the evil").
Its only other performance was in Twickenham Stadium on 20 September 2003 during the Licks Tour.
Folk singers Joan Baez and Judy Collins each recorded versions of the song (in 1971 and 1975, respectively).  Baez included the song in her set during her October 2011 performance for Occupy Wall Street protesters in Manhattan.
Rotary Connection covered the song for their album, Songs, (1969).
Jamaican Reggae musician Dandy Livingstone covered the song in 1971. A soul version was recorded by Johnny Adams for his album From the Heart (1984).
Blues singer Bettye LaVette covered the song on her 2010 album, Interpretations: The British Songbook.
"Salt of the Earth" is also the title to a documentary on the Rolling Stones 2005-06 'A Bigger Bang' World Tour.

Personnel
Mick Jaggervocals
Keith Richardsguitars, vocals
Bill Wymanbass guitar
Charlie Wattsdrums
Nicky Hopkinspiano
 Watts Street Gospel Choirbackground vocals

Cover versions
1970: Jamaican reggae band the Cables as a single, released on Trojan Records in the UK.
1971: Dandy Livingstone as a single, also on Trojan.
1971: Joan Baez on the studio album, Blessed Are...
1975: Judy Collins on the studio album, Judith.
2001: Proud Mary on the studio album, The Same Old Blues.

References

Bibliography
Stephen, Davis. Watch You Bleed: The Saga of Guns N' Roses. New York: Penguin Group, 2008.

1968 songs
1970 singles
Song recordings produced by Jimmy Miller
Songs written by Jagger–Richards
The Rolling Stones songs
Trojan Records singles